The  is a constituency that represents Hyogo Prefecture in the House of Councillors in the Diet of Japan. It currently has five Councillors in the 242-member house, but this representation will increase to six by July 2019.

Outline
The constituency represents the entire Hyogo Prefecture, which includes the urban centres of Kobe and the Hanshin region, as well as the rural areas to the north and west of the prefecture and Awaji Island. The district has 4,644,254 registered voters as of June 2016, the eighth-highest in the country. The Councillors currently representing Hyogo are:
 Shinsuke Suematsu (Liberal Democratic Party (LDP); term ends in 2016)
 Shunichi Mizuoka (Democratic Party; term ends in 2016)
 Yoshitada Konoike (LDP; term ends in 2019)
 Takayuki Shimizu (elected as a Japan Restoration Party candidate, currently belongs to Initiatives from Osaka; term ends in 2019)

Representation in the House
From the first House of Councillors election in 1947 until the 1992 election, Hyogo elected six Councillors in two sets of three at elections held every three years. Under 1994 electoral reform Hyogo's representation was reduced to four (two sets of two), which took effect from the 1995 election. Twenty years later, the district had the same level of representation as not only the Hokkaido and Fukuoka districts, which also had more than 4 million voters each, but also the Niigata, Miyagi and Nagano districts, which each had less than 2 million voters. To address this malapportionment in representation, a 2015 revision of the Public Officers Election Law increased the representation of the Hyogo, Hokkaido and Fukuoka districts to six Councillors; this change began to take effect at the July 2016 election, at which three Councillors were elected by the district for the first time since 1992. The district's representation will return to six Councillors at the next election, due by July 2019. At the same time, the Niigata, Miyagi and Nagano districts will be reduced to two Councillors.

2016 election

Candidates
The list of candidates for the election on 10 July 2016 was officially released on 22 June 2016. During the nomination period, the opposition Democratic, Communist, Social Democratic and People's Life parties formed an agreement to field only one joint candidate in districts where only one seat is contested. In Hyogo, which will elect three Councillors for the first time since 1992, a total of seven candidates have nominated, including both incumbents Suematsu and Mizuoka.  Komeito, the LDP's junior coalition partner, nominated a candidate for the first time since 1992, after having refrained from competing against the LDP during the period that only two seats were contested. Former Hyogo Prefectural Assembly member Mineo Kaneda will contest the district for the Communist Party for the second time, after having come fourth in the 2013 election. Initiatives from Osaka nominated Daisuke Katayama, a former NHK journalist from Okayama.

Results
The coalition government's candidates saw a large swing in their favour, with Suematsu and Ito receiving a combined 48.5% of the vote. Mizuoka was unable to win a third term; he was defeated by Katayama by a margin of 4.6%, leaving the Democratic Party without representation in the district. It was one of 13 seats the party lost nationwide in a strong victory for the ruling coalition. Katayama was one of seven successful Initiatives from Osaka candidates. Voter turnout at the election was 53.74%, an increase of 0.72% from the previous election but slightly below the national average of 54.70%, which had also improved slightly from 2013.

Voters in the election also submitted a second ballot for the nationwide 48-seat proportional district. The LDP received 31.7% of the vote, which was below their national result of 35.9%. Initiatives from Osaka received 19.5% of the vote in Hyogo, more than double their nationwide average. The high level of support in Hyogo and Osaka won the party 4 of the 48 seats. The Democratic (15.8%), Komieto (15.3%) and Communist (10.3%) parties were the other parties to receive more than two percent of the vote.

Previously elected councillors

Previous election results

See also
List of districts of the House of Councillors of Japan
Hyogo Prefecture districts for the House of Representatives:
Hyogo 1st district
Hyogo 2nd district
Hyogo 8th district
Hyogo 11th district

References

External links
 

Districts of the House of Councillors (Japan)